Herrick Elevator is a grain elevator in Herrick, South Dakota. It was built in 1907, and added to the National Register of Historic Places in 2003. The elevator was in service until 1998. It has since been restored along with the attached shed that has been converted into lodgings.

See also
National Register of Historic Places listings in Gregory County, South Dakota

References

Industrial buildings completed in 1907
Agricultural buildings and structures in South Dakota
Agricultural buildings and structures on the National Register of Historic Places in South Dakota
Buildings and structures in Gregory County, South Dakota
Grain elevators in the United States
Historic districts on the National Register of Historic Places in South Dakota
National Register of Historic Places in Gregory County, South Dakota
Towers in South Dakota